Hans Spiegel (2 February 1894 – 15 September 1966) was a German painter. His work was part of the painting event in the art competition at the 1936 Summer Olympics.

References

1894 births
1966 deaths
20th-century German painters
20th-century German male artists
German male painters
Olympic competitors in art competitions
People from Bad Kissingen (district)